Ehsham (also Romanized as Eḩshām and Aḩshām; also known as Eyshūm and Ishom) is a village in Chah Varz Rural District, in the Central District of Lamerd County, Fars Province, Iran. At the 2006 census, its population was 345, in 65 families.

References 

Populated places in Lamerd County